Rudolf Jendek (born 8 April 1972 in Bratislava) is a Slovak former professional ice hockey defenceman.

He played in the Slovak Extraliga for HC Slovan Bratislava, HK Nitra, HC Košice and HK 36 Skalica. He also played in the Austrian Hockey League for HC TWK Innsbruck.

Career statistics

References

1972 births
Living people
HC Slovan Bratislava players
HC TWK Innsbruck players
HC Košice players
HK Nitra players
HK 36 Skalica players
Slovak ice hockey defencemen
Ice hockey people from Bratislava
Expatriate ice hockey players in Austria
Slovak expatriate ice hockey people
Slovak expatriate sportspeople in Austria